Tourism: Songs from Studios, Stages, Hotelrooms & Other Strange Places is the fourth studio album by Swedish pop duo Roxette, released on 28 August 1992 by EMI. Despite often being mistaken for a live album, the record was described by Roxette in its liner notes as a "tour album"; the band recorded the majority of its material in numerous recording studios in-between live dates of their worldwide Join the Joyride! Tour. The album contains three live concert recordings, while another track was recorded live in an empty nightclub in São Paulo. A further two tracks were recorded in Buenos Aires' Alvear Palace Hotel.

The album received mixed reviews from American publications upon release, with several of them confused over its concept, and incorrectly describing it as containing just five previously unreleased songs. It also underperformed on the Billboard 200, peaking at number 117 on the chart and selling approximately 278,000 copies—far short of the million-selling Joyride. Nevertheless, the album was a commercial success in Europe, and was certified platinum in numerous territories. As of 2001, Tourism had sold over 6 million copies worldwide.

Background and recording
Tourism was described by Roxette in the album's liner notes as a "tour album, [...] not a live album". It consists of songs recorded by the band in various locations during the "Join the Joyride! Tour". The idea was to "create and collect material along the way; to record our music in different environments in different parts of the world; to take advantage of the excitement and the energy within the band on a tour like this." It does contain several live recordings, including versions of "The Look" and "Joyride" taken from their 13 December 1991 performance at the Sydney Entertainment Centre, as well as an acoustic version of Joyride album track "Things Will Never Be the Same" from a November 1991 concert in Zürich. A portion of a live performance of "It Must Have Been Love" from their 25 April 1992 concert at San Carlos Stadium in Santiago, Chile is used as an intro to a new studio recording of the song. This new version was recorded in Ocean Way Recording Studios in March 1992, and features k.d. lang guitarist Greg Leisz performing pedal steel guitar. Also recorded there was new song "The Heart Shaped Sea", which again features Leisz.

The band recorded several songs while touring in Latin America in May 1992. Two songs were recorded in Brazil: the album's third single, "Fingertips", was recorded in Nas Nuvens Recording Studio in Rio de Janeiro; "Never Is a Long Time" was recorded live in an empty nightclub in São Paulo. "Here Comes the Weekend" and a new version of "So Far Away" – originally released on their 1986 debut Pearls of Passion – were recorded live in room 603 of the Alvear Palace Hotel in Buenos Aires, Argentina, on 4 May 1992. Two other previously released studio recordings are included on the album: "Silver Blue" was originally released as a b-side to "The Look" in 1988; "Come Back (Before You Leave)" appeared on the "Joyride" single in 1991.

The majority of the remaining tracks were recorded at EMI Studios in Stockholm between late March and early April 1992, with the exception of "Cinnamon Street", which was overdubbed at Medley Studios in Copenhagen, Denmark, on 6 July. The album's second single, "Queen of Rain", was recorded in July 1990 in Stockholm during the sessions for Joyride. It was originally set to appear as that album's final track, but was later excluded in favour of "Perfect Day". However, the closing notes and sound effects of the Joyride version of "Things Will Never Be the Same" – that album's second-last song – can still be heard over the crowd noise on the intro of "Queen of Rain". Until 2011's Charm School and 2016's Good Karma, Tourism was the first and only Roxette album to not contain any material composed by Marie Fredriksson, who would release her fourth Swedish-language solo album, Den ständiga resan, just five weeks after Tourism was released.

Critical reception

The album received generally positive reviews upon release. A review for Billboard complimented the album for abandoning the "production glitz" of past work, while Bryan Buss of AllMusic said that the album "spotlights how strong an act they are even without the benefit of studio production." He praised the re-recorded version of "It Must Have Been Love", saying "you have to hear 45,000 Chilean fans singing back-up to truly appreciate what was one of their least affecting ballads", and said that the album demonstrates "what true pop craftsmanship is." He compared the album to Joyride, saying that both releases contained very little filler, before summarising that Tourism was "Not quite a greatest hits package, this is your best bet as an introduction to Roxette."

Dennis Hunt of Los Angeles Times, who incorrectly described the album as containing just five new songs, praised Fredriksson's vocals. He referred to her as being "one of pop's best and most underrated singers", but said that the material on Tourism was "beneath her talents". He awarded the album two-and-a-half stars out of four, highlighting her performance for transforming "low-grade fluff into passable–often delectable–pop." Entertainment Weekly referred to the album as a "stopgap measure between discs", but said that the "catchy and pop-savvy Tourism ain't half bad", awarding the album a grade of B−.

Commercial performance
Though not matching the success of the duo's previous studio albums, Tourism had sold in excess of 6 million copies worldwide. The album had little impact on American music charts, peaking at number 117 on the Billboard 200—in stark contrast to Joyride, which peaked at number 12 on the same chart. As of January 2009, it had sold 278,000 copies in the US. It peaked at number 18 on the national RPM albums chart in Canada, where it has been certified platinum by Music Canada (formerly the Canadian Recording Industry Association) for shipments in excess of 100,000 units.

It did far better elsewhere, especially in Europe, topping the European Top 100 Albums chart for four consecutive weeks in September 1992. In the duo's native Sweden, the album spent two weeks at number one and was certified triple platinum by the Swedish Recording Industry Association for shipments in excess of 300,000 units. It also topped the charts in other Nordic countries, including Denmark, Finland and Norway. The album was a massive commercial success in Germany, spending five consecutive weeks at number one there. It was certified triple gold by the Bundesverband Musikindustrie (BVMI) for shipments in excess of 750,000 units. The album debuted at number two on the UK Albums Chart, where it was held off the top spot by Mike Oldfield's Tubular Bells II. It spent 17 weeks on the chart, and was certified gold by the British Phonographic Industry (BPI) in September 1992, denoting shipments in excess of 100,000 copies.

Track listing

Personnel
Credits adapted from the liner notes of Tourism.

 Roxette are Per Gessle and Marie Fredriksson
 Recorded at various locations between September 1987 and July 1992
 Mastered by Ted Jensen at Sterling Sound Studios, New York City
 Remastered by Alar Suurna at Polar Studio, Stockholm (2009 reissue)
 All songs published by Jimmy Fun Music, except: "Hotblooded" by Shock the Music/Jimmy Fun Music

Musicians
 Marie Fredriksson – lead and background vocals; piano ; liner notes
 Per Gessle – lead and background vocals; acoustic guitar ; rhythm guitar ; harmonica ; mixing; liner notes
 Per "Pelle" Alsing – drums ; percussion ; Samsonite suitcase 
 Vicki Benckert – backing vocals ; accordion ; percussion 
 Bo Eriksson – oboe 
 Anders Herrlin – engineering ; programming ; bass guitar
 Jonas Isacsson – mandolin ; acoustic and electric guitars
 Greg Leisz – pedal steel guitar 
 Mia Lindgren – backing vocals 
 Clarence Öfwerman – programming ; piano ; keyboards; production; mixing
 Staffan Öfwerman – backing vocals ; percussion ; tambourine 
 Mats "MP" Persson – engineering ; acoustic guitar 
 Alar Suurna – maracas ; tambourine ; engineering; mixing

Technical
 Kjell Andersson – sleeve design
 Henry Diltz – photography
 Mattias Edwall – photography
 Lennart Haglund – engineer 
 Patrick Hanson – engineer 
 Paulo Junqueiro – engineer 
 Antoine Midani – assistant engineer 
 Matt Murray – photography
 Oli Poulsen – engineer 
 Rail Rogut – assistant engineer 
 Mike Ross – engineer

Charts

Weekly charts

Year-end charts

Certifications and sales

References

External links
 

1992 albums
EMI Records albums
Roxette albums